Chaconia is a genus of rust fungi in the Chaconiaceae family. The widespread genus contains seven species that grow mostly on dicots, especially Leguminosae.

References

External links

Pucciniales